The Lost Slayer is a series of four novels written by Christopher Golden. It was later collected together in one omnibus paperback. Each was published by Pocket Books



The Lost Slayer I: Prophecies

Description

As Buffy is starting out her freshman year at UC Sunnydale she decides to take charge and do everything herself. How else can she hope to have a normal life without mastering everything she does? But unfortunately it results in isolation from her friends and angers Willow, who tries to understand but to no avail. When a particularly nasty group of vampires with bats tattooed across their faces with eyes that glow with a surreal orange fire arrive in Sunnydale, Buffy tries her best to keep them at bay. Giles researches to find out that this particular breed of vampires are a group of followers who are led by and worship the deity Camazotz. Things start to look even worse when the past Slayer Lucy Hanover visits Buffy in her sleep. After a run-in with Camazotz where Giles gets captured and most of the Scooby Gang ends up injured, Buffy decides to call on Lucy Hanover to help them out. Lucy then calls on the Prophet who tells Buffy that her mistake has already been made. As the Prophet touches Buffy she is thrown 5 years into the future where she's been locked in a cage for the past five years.

Continuity
This book establishes an alternate timeline in season four.

The Lost Slayer II: Dark Times

Description

Buffy, now 24 years old, has been locked in her prison for the past 5 years. One day her captors finally throw the new Slayer, August, in there with her; Faith was killed a few months ago. The confused girl tries to kill Buffy, reasoning that this is the only way to ensure that there's a Slayer active outside, but Buffy accidentally snaps her spine, killing her. Buffy finally escapes from her prison when the guards arrive after the scuffle. She flees into Sunnydale and finds to her surprise that someone has left her old crossbow for her in an old drive-in where she also makes some wooden stakes by breaking up chairs. Once escaped, she finds out that Sunnydale has been taken over by vampires with humans helping them out of fear (although there are some, like Parker Abrams, who actually enjoy their new roles in life). After a call to the Watcher's Council and a fight with various vampires (Including Harmony, Drusilla and Spike, all of whom but Spike are killed), Buffy meets up with the extraction team which includes (among others) Willow, who is now a powerful sorceress; Xander, now a grim and humorless man; and Oz, who can change into a werewolf whenever he chooses. Thanks to the extraction team, Buffy escapes.

In the present, Buffy has been possessed by the Prophet. Once Willow has found this out, they realize they need to prevent Buffy's body from leaving Sunnydale. While the Prophet is leaving Sunnydale, Camazotz appears, tears the entity out of Buffy's body, and destroys it. The Prophet is actually Zotziloha, Camazotz's wife, who was attempting to hide in the Slayer's body. After the fight Buffy is captured and imprisoned, the reasoning being that the only way to stop the Slayer is to imprison her; otherwise another Slayer will just be activated.  This is done on the orders of Giles, who is now a vampire. He spares Buffy's friends, but more because they are not important than any lingering emotion towards them. In the future, Buffy is informed that Giles is not only a vampire, he's become the king of the vampires, the one who rules the future Sunnydale and was responsible for her imprisoning. Future Giles is the threat that everyone fears in the future.

Continuity

The alternate timeline moves five years into a possible future.

The Lost Slayer III: King of the Dead

Description

Giles has become the king of vampires and even Spike is under his rule. Drusilla is dead and Spike seeks revenge on Giles who was the one who sent Drusilla out to kill the Slayer. After Giles casts him out from his lair, Spike immediately goes to the human headquarters. Meanwhile, Buffy is trying to reacquaint herself with all of her friends... or at least they used to be her friends. Her twin spirits are confused by the changes she'd had to go through and finds it difficult to accept that the future is so different; Joyce and Anya are dead, Wesley is the Watcher for the latest Slayer, and Angel vanished five years ago when he tried to rescue Buffy.  Spike shows up looking to let Buffy in on everything he knows, but he's caught as a priest, Father Lonergan, can sense vampires and senses him coming allowing Buffy to capture him. After finding out that Spike was the one that killed her mom, Buffy tortures him for information, but it's Xander who finally stakes him, in Anya's honour after they learn everything they need to know from him.  The information they learn is disturbing: not only does Giles now rule Sunnydale and nearby El Surte, he's working on LA too and due to his methodical plans, he will succeed if not stopped. Meanwhile, Giles- who is capable of predicting all of Buffy's moves in a confrontation- has plans for Buffy; he plans to make her a vampire so that she could be by his side once again.  He sneaks into the Council base and during the confrontation reveals he helped Buffy escape her prison and was the one that left her that crossbow as he wanted to test her reflexes.  After Buffy fails to kill him (more out of lingering emotion towards her old friend and mentor than anything else), he leaves.  The next day, Buffy, now taking command of the Council's forces, leads a massive attack on Sunnydale with the purpose of finding and killing Giles in order to end his reign.  An army of Council forces marches on the town to liberate it with Buffy and her friends leading an attack directly on City Hall while other groups go to other sites around town that are vampire nests to eliminate them.  The book ends during the attack on City Hall when Buffy and her friends investigate the basement and find the long-missing Camazotz now a prisoner of Giles and little more than a battery for his Kakchiquels, several of whom are feeding on him.  As the book ends, the group is noticed by the feeding vampires and the now insane Camazotz.

Continuity

Follows continuity established in Lost Slayer Volume I and II.
Reference is made to the Initiative, with one of the Council commenting that the government had a secret organisation in Sunnydale dedicated to the study of demons.

The Lost Slayer IV: Original Sins

Description

Buffy, Xander and Willow have found a weakened and insane Camazotz which they accidentally release from his magical chains. Willow figures out how to kill Camaztoz: with gold, through alchemy which can only be done if it's not used for personal gain.  Willow is able to create a golden crossbow bolt and kill Camazotz with it.  Meanwhile, Anna, the new Slayer, and Wesley try to reduce the vampire population though Wesley gets seriously injured. Now that Camazotz is dead, the Kakchiquels have lost all their power and are reduced to only regular vampire strength but there is still many, a whole army all loyal to Giles.

Shortly after, Willow, Xander, Oz and Buffy enter a room to find Angel suspended in mid-air with a stake protruding from his heart, and yet he still lives. Giles has imprisoned Angel here for the past five years when Angel went out searching for Buffy. The orb Angel is trapped in freezes his body in the moment before his death; if the spell is broken, Angel will instantly die. Giles finds them all and Buffy stays to fight while the others rush off to help the other troops. Buffy initially is hesitant as Giles plays on her emotions, but with the help of Angel, she finally breaks through it, fighting Giles with the same sword she once sent Angel to Hell with. Eventually Giles gets the sword, but Buffy tricks him into hitting the orb trapping Angel, injuring Giles and causing Angel to finally die. Buffy grabs the stake Giles killed Angel with and stakes Giles, finally killing him, despite him taking on his human face again to play on her emotions. Meanwhile, Willow and Buffy's other friends try to help in the main fight, but there are too many vampires and most of the Council operatives are dead, leaving only three left. Wesley is killed by Giles' second in command Jax, who goes to kill Anna, the other Slayer, but Xander sacrifices himself to save her, killing Jax. The grief of his death causes Willow to tap into all her power and destroy the vampire army by smashing the windows and uncovering them, exposing the vampires to sunlight. Unfortunately both Wesley and Xander die as well as many of the Council operatives, but Giles and his army are dead and the world is saved.

Finally Willow figures out a spell to send Buffy back in time. Guided by Lucy Hanover, Buffy goes back to the day where she told Willow that she didn't need her help with Camaztoz. But this time she asks for help. As Buffy fights to free Giles she is backed up by her friends. Thanks to a timely distraction from Willow, Buffy saves Giles where she couldn't before and he never becomes a vampire and thus never the Vampire King. Willow binds Zotzilaha into a snowglobe, but not before they force her to tell them where to find Camazotz. Buffy tries to have present-day Willow perform the alchemy spell before the final battle, but unlike her future self, she can't as she doesn't know the secret and is still unable to during the battle once she is asked to. Buffy and her friends defeat Camazotz's army, killing most of them before Buffy battles Camazotz, who is somewhat weakened from a previous attack from Willow. Desperate, he kills his remaining Kakchiquels, absorbing their power into himself and grows extremely powerful, easily beating Buffy. On the verge of defeat, Willow tries the alchemy spell again and manages to turn a stake to gold for Buffy. Catching Camazotz by surprise, Buffy stakes him through the heart with her golden stake, killing Camazotz and averting the future she visited completely. With Camazotz dead, Willow throws the golden stake overboard of the ship they were battling on and Buffy and her friends return home, with Buffy now possessing a new appreciation for her friends.

Continuity

Follows continuity established in Lost Slayer Volume I, II, and III.

Canonical issues

Buffy books such as this one are not usually considered by fans as canonical. Some fans consider them stories from the imaginations of authors and artists, while other fans consider them as taking place in an alternative fictional reality. However unlike fan fiction, overviews summarising their story, written early in the writing process, were 'approved' by both Fox and Joss Whedon (or his office), and the books were therefore later published as officially Buffy/Angel merchandise.

External links

Reviews

Book I
Litefoot1969.bravepages.com - Review of book one by Litefoot
Teen-books.com - Reviews Book I
Nika-summers.com - Review of book 1 by Nika Summers
Shadowcat.name - Review of book one

Book II
Litefoot1969.bravepages.com - Review of book two by Litefoot
Teen-books.com - Reviews Book II
Nika-summers.com - Review of book 2 by Nika Summers
Shadowcat.name - Review of book two

Book III
Litefoot1969.bravepages.com - Review of book three by Litefoot
Teen-books.com - Reviews Book III
Nika-summers.com - Review of book 3 by Nika Summers
Shadowcat.name - Review of book three

Book IV
Litefoot1969.bravepages.com - Review of book four by Litefoot
Teen-books.com - Reviews Book IV
Nika-summers.com - Review of book 4 by Nika Summers
Shadowcat.name - Review of book four

2001 novels
Books based on Buffy the Vampire Slayer
Novel series
Pocket Books books